Deadwood is the lower part of a ship's stem or stern.

External links

References 
 A Practical Course in Wooden Boat and Ship Building, page 19
 Shipbuilding Terms

Nautical terminology
Shipbuilding